Pseudolithoxus kelsorum is a species of catfish in the family Loricariidae. It is native to South America, where it is known only from a single site in the Orinoco drainage, located above the Maipures Rapids and south of the Atures Rapids (near the Atures Municipality) in the Venezuelan state of Amazonas. The species reaches 6.6 cm (2.6 inches) SL.

P. kelsorum appears in the aquarium trade, where it is usually referred to either as the banded pancake pleco (presumably referencing its patterning and its dorsoventrally flattened shape) or by its associated L-number, which is L-189.

References 

Fish described in 2011
Loricariidae